Dasaratha Jataka is a Jataka Tale found in Buddhist literature about the previous life of the Shakyamuni (Gautama) Buddha as a prince named Rama. It is found as 461th Jataka story in Khuddaka Nikaya of Sutta Pitaka in the Pali Canon. The Thai national epic, 'Ramakien', is claimed to be based on this Jataka.

Synopsis 
The Jataka describes the previous birth of Buddha as Rama-Pandita, a Bodhisattva. The Jataka focus on moral of Non-Attachment and Obedience. Bodhisatta, the crown prince, was sent to exile of twelve years by his father, King Dasaratha, as his father was afraid that the Bodhisatta would be killed by his step-mother for the kingdom (of Varanasi). Rama-Pandita's younger brother, Lakkhana-Kumara and his (Rama) wife, Sita-Devi followed him. But, the King died just after nine years. Bharata The son of the step-mother being kind and honorable refused to be crowned; as the right belong to his older brother. They went to look for the Bodhisatta and the other two until they found them, and told the three about their father's death. Both Lakkhana-Kumara and Sita could not bear the sorrow of father's death, but Bodhisatta was silent. He said, the sorrow can't bring his dead father back, then why to sorrow? Everything is impermanent. All the listeners lost their grief. He refused to be crowned at that time to keep his word to his father (as his exile was not completed) and gave his slippers to rule the kingdom instead. After the exile, the Bodhisatta returned to the kingdom and everybody celebrated the event. Then he ruled the kingdom very wisely for 16,000 years.

Verses 
Following verses are given in the Pali Canon:

References

Sutta Pitaka
Pali Buddhist texts
Jataka tales

External links